Dysschema flavopennis is a moth of the family Erebidae first described by Rebel in 1901. It is found in Colombia.

References

Moths described in 1901
Dysschema